Stelis trulla is a species of orchid plant native to Peru.

References 

trulla 
Flora of Peru